Carlos de Almeida Baptista Júnior (born in Rio de Janeiro) is a Brazilian military, Lieutenant-Brigadier of the Air, and Commander of the Brazilian Air Force. Baptista Júnior became commander in April 2021, replacing Antonio Carlos Moretti Bermudez.

Personal life
Baptista Júniore joined the Air Force on 3 March 1975 and was promoted to Lieutenant Brigadier in 2018. He is son of the Former Commander of the Air Force, Lieutenant-Brigadier of the Air, Carlos de Almeida Baptista, who was in command between 1999 and 2003.

Military Awards
  Order of Defence Merit (Grand Officer)
  Order of Aeronautical Merit (Grand Officer)
  Order of Naval Merit (Grand Officer)
  Order of Military Merit (Grand Officer)
  Order of Military Judiciary Merit (Grand Officer)
  Santos-Dumont Merit Medal

References

|-

Living people
People from Rio de Janeiro (city)
Brazilian Air Force generals
1960 births